Hagby Church is a medieval round church in Hagby, Kalmar County in Sweden. It belongs to the Diocese of Växjö.

History and architecture
Hagby Church dates from the late 12th century. It was preceded by a wooden chapel dedicated to Saint Sigfrid of Sweden a few kilometres south of the present church; by 1541 it was abandoned. The present church was dedicated to Saint Olaf during the Catholic era .

The church was built in a round shape to serve both a religious purpose and a defensive one, i.e. it was a fortified church. 17 arrowslits have been identified in the upper part of the wall. The interior layout has changed considerably through the centuries. Originally it consisted of two floors, a basement floor and an upper floor that served as the church proper. The present layout of the church largely dates from a renovation carried out in 1968.

Inside the church, there are fragments of frescos from the 14th century on the walls. The church contains a wooden crucifix from the 16th century and a baptismal font of Gotlandic limestone. The pulpit dates from the 1760s. A silver chalice and paten dating from the 16th century were found under the church floor during a renovation in 1889, and are today part of the collections of the Swedish History Museum.

References

External links

Churches in the Diocese of Växjö
Fortified church buildings